Francisco Alves (born 24 May 1923) was a Portuguese water polo player. He competed in the men's tournament at the 1952 Summer Olympics. In 1987, he was a recipient of the Silver Olympic Order.

References

External links
 

1923 births
Possibly living people
Olympic water polo players of Portugal
Portuguese male water polo players
Water polo players at the 1952 Summer Olympics
Sportspeople from Lisbon
Recipients of the Olympic Order